Georg Emke is a retired Swedish footballer. Emke made 18 Allsvenskan appearances for Djurgården and scored 1 goals.

References

Swedish footballers
Allsvenskan players
Djurgårdens IF Fotboll players
Association footballers not categorized by position
Year of birth missing